The Railway, widely known as Gare Saint-Lazare, is an 1873 painting by Édouard Manet.  It is the last painting by Manet of his favourite model, the fellow painter Victorine Meurent, who was also the model for his earlier works Olympia and the Luncheon on the Grass.  It was exhibited at the Paris Salon in 1874, and donated to the National Gallery of Art in Washington, D.C. in 1956.

Painting
Meurent is depicted sitting to the left side of the frame, in front of an iron fence near the Gare Saint-Lazare in Paris. The pensive subject is wearing a dark hat and sombre deep blue dress with white details, and is looking towards the viewer, while a sleeping puppy, a fan and an open book rest in her lap. Next to her is a little girl, modelled by the daughter of Manet's neighbour , a contrasting figure wearing a white dress with large blue bow, standing her back to the viewer, watching through the railings as a train passes beneath them. The black band in the girl's hair echoes the black band around the neck of the woman. Instead of choosing the traditional natural view as background for an outdoor scene, Manet opted for the iron grating which "stretches across the canvas." The only evidence of the train is its white cloud of steam.

The arrangement compresses the foreground into a narrow focus, separated from the background by the row of railings. The traditional convention of deep space is ignored.  Resting on a parapet to the right of the painting is a bunch of grapes, perhaps indicating that the painting was made in the autumn.  The dog may be a reference to Titian's Venus of Urbino; Manet had earlier echoed Titian's composition in his Olympia.

Reception
Historian Isabelle Dervaux has described the reception this painting received when it was first exhibited at the official Paris Salon of 1874: "Visitors and critics found its subject baffling, its composition incoherent, and its execution sketchy. Caricaturists ridiculed Manet's picture, in which only a few recognized the symbol of modernity that it has become today". 

Shortly after it was completed, the painting was sold to baritone Jean-Baptiste Faure.  It was sold in 1881 for 5,400 francs to the art dealer Paul Durand-Ruel, who gave it several names: Enfant regardant le chemin de fer, Le pont de l'Europe, A la Gare St. Lazare, and later just Gare St. Lazare.  It was sold on 31 December 1898 for 100,000 francs to American Henry Osborne Havemeyer. His wife Louisine Havemeyer left 2,000 artworks to the Metropolitan Museum of Art in New York on her death in 1929, but she divided a small collection, including The Railway, among her three children.  The painting was donated to the National Gallery of Art in Washington, D.C. in 1956 on the death of her son Horace Havemeyer.

References

External links

 

Paintings by Édouard Manet
Collections of the National Gallery of Art
1873 paintings
Books in art
Dogs in art
Paintings of children